The Center for Education Reform is an education reform organization headquartered in Washington, D.C. Founded in 1993, CER advocates for school choice.

Legislation
The Success and Opportunity through Quality Charter Schools Act (H.R. 10; 113th Congress) was introduced into the United States House of Representatives on April 1, 2014 and passed in the House on May 7, 2014. The Center for Education Reform was critical of the bill, cautioning that "it is nothing more than a natural progression of the federal government becoming too involved in charter school policy." The organization argued that "the federal government is taking too much of a direct role in defining 'quality' and 'high performance' charter schools," taking away power from the states to make their own decisions about what charter schools qualify for grants. They argued that this takes away the autonomy and innovation that define charter schools, discounts parental choices about schools, and, due to the formulaic nature of these evaluations, discourages charter management organizations from taking over failing schools (since the failing school will hurt their scores).

References

External links
 Organizational Profile – National Center for Charitable Statistics (Urban Institute)

Educational organizations based in the United States